The 2022 Rachael Heyhoe Flint Trophy was the third edition of the Rachael Heyhoe Flint Trophy, an English women's cricket 50-over domestic competition, which took place between 2 July and 25 September 2022. It featured eight teams playing in a round-robin group, followed by a knock-out round. The holders were the Southern Vipers, who won the first two editions of the competition. It ran alongside the Charlotte Edwards Cup. The tournament was named after former England captain Rachael Heyhoe Flint, Baroness Heyhoe-Flint, who died in 2017.

Northern Diamonds finished top of the group stage, qualifying directly for the final. South East Stars and Southern Vipers qualified for the play-off, which was won by Vipers to set up the third Vipers versus Diamonds final in the Rachael Heyhoe Flint Trophy in its three years of existence. Northern Diamonds won the final by two runs to claim their first title.

Format

Teams played each other once in a group of eight, with the top three qualifying for the knock-out stage. The second-placed team played the third-placed team in a play-off, with the winner advancing to play the first-placed team in the final. The final was held at Lord's for the first time.

Teams
The teams were as follows:
 Central Sparks (representing Warwickshire, Worcestershire, Herefordshire, Shropshire and Staffordshire)
 Lightning (representing Loughborough University, Derbyshire, Leicestershire, Nottinghamshire and Lincolnshire)
 Northern Diamonds (representing Yorkshire, Durham and Northumberland)
 North West Thunder (representing Lancashire, Cheshire and Cumbria)
 South East Stars (representing Surrey and Kent)
 Southern Vipers (representing Hampshire, Sussex, Berkshire, Buckinghamshire, Dorset, Isle of Wight and Oxfordshire)
 Sunrisers  (representing Middlesex, Essex, Northamptonshire, Bedfordshire, Cambridgeshire, Hertfordshire, Huntingdonshire, Norfolk and Suffolk)
 Western Storm (representing Glamorgan, Gloucestershire, Somerset, Cornwall, Devon, Wiltshire and Cricket Wales)

Standings
Teams received 4 points for a win. A bonus point was given where the winning team's run rate was 1.25 or greater times that of the opposition. In case of a tie in the standings, the following tiebreakers were applied in order: highest net run rate, team that scored the most points in matches involving the tied parties, better bowling strike rate, drawing of lots.

 advanced to final
 advanced to the play-off

Fixtures

Group stage
Source:

Play-off

Final

Statistics
Highest score by a team: Northern Diamonds – 334/6 (50 overs) v Western Storm (11 September).
 Top score by an individual: Hollie Armitage – 131* (131) v Western Storm (11 September).
 Best bowling figures by an individual: Alex Hartley – 6/24 (10 overs) v South East Stars (16 July).

Most runs

Source: ESPNCricinfo

Most wickets

Source: ESPNCricinfo

References

Rachael Heyhoe Flint Trophy
2022 in English women's cricket